Autosticha binaria is a moth in the family Autostichidae. It was described by Edward Meyrick in 1908. It is found in Sri Lanka.

The wingspan is about 13 mm. The forewings are purplish fuscous suffusedly irrorated (sprinkled) with dark fuscous and the hindwings blackish.

References

Moths described in 1908
Autosticha
Moths of Asia